KVCV may refer to:

 Southern California Logistics Airport (ICAO code KVCV)
 KVCV-LD, a low-power television station (channel 23, virtual 48) licensed to serve Victoria, Texas, United States; see List of television stations in Texas
 KVCV-LP, a defunct low-power television station (channel 42) formerly licensed to serve Victoria, Texas